Alberto Manzi (Rome, 3 November 1924 – Pitigliano, 4 December 1997) was an Italian school teacher, writer and television host, best known for being the art director of the  ("It's never too late"), an educational TV programme broadcast between 1959 and 1968.

Biography 
He attended navy studies before ending his primary training high school degree and followed a peculiar path of studies, achieving three academic degrees: in biology, pedagogy and philosophy.
He worked as an educator in a teen-age prison in Rome before a full-time job as a primary school teacher.
He was chosen to host the TV program Non è mai troppo tardi, that made him a celebrity, conceived as an auxiliary help in the social struggle against illiteracy; the show was broadcasting real life primary school classroom lessons, with revolutionary concepts in didactic methods for those times. Several schools in Italy are indeed named after him.
He also published several novels the most famous of which is Orzowei (1955), from which a serial was adapted for the Tv dei ragazzi (a now defunct Italian "Children TV").
From 1995 to 1997 he was mayor of Pitigliano, in the province of Grosseto, Tuscany.

Mass media people from Rome
Italian male writers
Italian schoolteachers
Italian television personalities
1997 deaths
1924 births